Everton is an unincorporated community in Jackson Township, Fayette County, Indiana.

History
Everton was laid out as a town prior to 1836, but because the records have been lost, it is not known exactly when. The origin of the name is likewise lost to history.

A post office was established at Everton in 1827, and remained in operation until it was discontinued in 1937.

Geography

References

Unincorporated communities in Fayette County, Indiana
Unincorporated communities in Indiana